Skin Trade is the seventeenth book in the Anita Blake: Vampire Hunter series of horror/mystery/erotica novels by Laurell K. Hamilton.

Plot introduction

While Anita Blake remains one of the most effective "legal vampire hunters" in the country, her personal life is in turmoil because of her close personal relationship with some vampires.  Amid this backdrop, Blake goes to Las Vegas to investigate a vampire's serial murder spree.

Plot summary

Summary
Vittorio has resurfaced in Las Vegas. Anita receives a head of one of the officers in Las Vegas, and sets out to pursue this vampire serial killer. Anita is joined by Edward (aka Ted Forrester), Bernardo Spotted Horse, and Olaf (aka Otto Jefferies).

Anita becomes bound to two other tigers, Cynric (blue) and Domino (black and white).

Characters in Skin Trade

Major characters

Anita Blake: Anita travels to Vegas because if she did not, she believes other people will die.  She goes without most of her loved ones because she is afraid that Vittorio will use them against her.  However, her troupe of men is always near her mind as she has to prove the male characters in Vegas that she is dangerous and does not sleep with anything that moves.  A main theme scattered in the pages is the idea of not adding to her list of men that she sleeps with, however, in the end there is no resolution.  A few more men are added to list, actually.
Edward / Ted Forrester: Edward plays Anita's main friend and adviser in 'Skin Trade' if there is a problem, Anita looks to him to help solve it.  The problems that he helps her range from her metaphysical issues to defending her from Olaf.  Edward acts a little like a boyfriend to her to keep Olaf at bay, since no one else that Anita dates or loves is dominant enough.  Yet Anita says she could never feed off Edward in any way because it would be like doing a family member.  Edward admits to have been contacted as Death to take out the Mother of Darkness and he turned down the contract.  The price was right, but he admits that he has commitments now, his alter-ego Ted has people who love him and Edward would prefer to return home to them than to fight something potentially more dangerous than he is.
Olaf / Otto Jefferies: In the beginning Olaf creeps Anita out repeatedly, as it becomes apparent that he "likes" her. As in, he'd like to date her. For Anita, Olaf would try to be normal, he admits.  In a tight moment, he offers to feed her if needed and says it would be regular sex, as little blood as necessary. Anita dances around the subject, trying not to get on his bad side, always remembering that some day she may have to kill him for her safety.
Bernardo Spotted Horse: Bernardo's role in the story is more comic relief. Anita cannot trust Olaf at her back and Edward as Death is scary to the preternatural community so the only other person to back Anita in situations is Bernardo. He mostly flirts with the female cast of the novel, but offers to be food if Anita needs him.
Crispin: A Vegas white tiger that Anita called and slept with in a previous novel, he remains devoted to her. The epilogue mentions that Anita took him to St. Louis with her, as he is more loyal to her than to his tiger queen in Vegas.
 Max: Master Vampire of the City of Las Vegas. His animal to call is tiger, and he is married to Bibiana, who is the Queen of the White Tigers. They have a son, Victor, who is a lycanthrope (white tiger). Resembles a Las Vegas Gangster.

Minor characters
Recurring characters include:

Wicked and Truth: The vampire brothers are supplied by Jean-Claude in Anita's time of need. They both feed her and show off their flying ability and emotional detachment. Anita voices a concern about her ardeur to them, asking them to kill her if it takes her over. They agree. The request seems well placed as the brothers murdered the head of their bloodline, and Anita doubts Edward could put her out of her misery if the situation demanded it.
Requiem: He is unhappy with the situation in St. Louis and is hoping that by traveling to Vegas, he can find a new place to call home. He would like to have a woman who exclusively loves him rather than Anita who has many men to love.
Jean-Claude: In Skin Trade, Jean-Claude acts a bit more like Richard than what might have been expected. He is jealous and moody when he speaks to Anita over the phone. However, he does manage to send a variety of lycanthropes and vampires to help her out toward the end of the story. Except for phone calls, he does not appear directly in the book. His presence in the book is indirect, as Anita longs to be with him instead of whatever she is currently facing in Vegas or when Anita is thinking about her life back in St. Louis.
Marmee Noir: The Mother of All Darkness attacks Anita a few times in the novel, yet at the end is supposedly killed by a human attack on her resting place. She is a sort of red herring in the book since Anita believes she is to blame for the were-tiger issues she has. She had hoped to possess Anita's body since Anita and her had similar powers when she was alive. However, she is too weak and the attempt to mingle all the tigers' colors/powers and feed off that energy is defeated by her death.
Vittorio: A centuries-old vampire who was mentioned in passing in Incubus Dreams. It is revealed that he is far more powerful than he first seemed and, like so many other male characters, he wants Anita but he cannot have her because of holy water damages he sustained and because she does not want him back. He has a ring that can control jinn and his animal to call is the tiger. He and Marmee Noir shared a history: she took most of his powers and left him mostly helpless in the world. However, with her awakening, he has been regaining his powers and Anita must destroy him before he lays waste to Vegas. As Marmee Noir has a nickname of "Mother of All Darkness," his name is "Father of the Day" or "Father of the Tigers."

Other characters
New characters include:

 Victor: Max's and Bibiana's white tiger son. Tiger clans are usually run by females, but Victor's power could place him as a king, he is that dominant. Bibiana would be happy to have Anita wed to him, but Anita is a bit "unavailable."
Domino: A were-tiger with the ability to change into either a black tiger or a white tiger. His hair reflects the color of the tiger he last changed into. In the beginning he is very wary of Anita, but she unintentionally wins him over as the black tiger clan is scarce in members.
Ava: Bibiana's assistant turned traitor.  She is a victim to a were-tiger attack and in Bibiana's clan seen as a lesser member because she's not a pure blood lycanthrope.
Bibiana: Queen ("Chang") of the White Tigers of Las Vegas, Wife of Max, Master Vampire of the City of Las Vegas, and  Victor's mother. Pushing to have her son and Anita start a branch White Tiger Clan.
Cynric: A 16-year-old blue weretiger and not of legal age of consent in St. Louis, MO, which is 17.  However, In Vegas, the legal age of consent is 16. Anita is perturbed by his youth and his devotion to her after a vampire-induced group orgy that Vittorio used to gain back many of his powers that Mamee Noir stripped from him. Bibiana intends to send him for mating with Anita as soon as he is 17.

Notes

2009 American novels
American erotic novels
American horror novels
American mystery novels
Anita Blake: Vampire Hunter novels
Low fantasy novels
Werewolf novels
Novels set in the Las Vegas Valley
Berkley Books books